The M Countdown Chart is a record chart on the South Korean Mnet television music program M Countdown. Every week, the show awards the best-performing single on the chart in the country during its live broadcast.

In 2021, 26 singles ranked number one on the chart and 23 music acts received first-place trophies. "Hwaa" by (G)I-dle, "Hot Sauce" by NCT Dream and "Sticker" by NCT 127 are the only songs to achieve a triple crown.  No release earned a perfect score, but "Don't Call Me" by Shinee acquired the highest point total of the year on the March 4 broadcast with a score of 10,990.

Scoring system 
Songs are judged based on a combination of Digital Sales (45%; Melon, Genie, FLO), Album Sales (15%), Social Media (15%; YouTube MV views), Global Fan Vote (15%), Mnet Broadcast (10%; Mnet TV, MCD Stage, M2 Contents), Live Vote (10%; for first place nominees only).

Chart history

References 

2021 in South Korean music
2021 record charts
Lists of number-one songs in South Korea